The 2015 Tennis Napoli Cup was a professional tennis tournament played on clay courts. It was the 18th edition of the tournament which was part of the 2015 ATP Challenger Tour. It took place in Naples, Italy between 6 April and 12 April 2015.

Singles main-draw entrants

Seeds

 1 Rankings are as of March 23, 2015.

Other entrants
The following players received wildcards into the singles main draw:
  Matteo Donati
  Federico Gaio
  Gianluigi Quinzi
  Filippo Volandri

The following players received entry from the qualifying draw:
  Benjamin Balleret
  Flavio Cipolla
  Thomas Fabbiano
  Alexis Musialek

Champions

Singles

  Daniel Muñoz de la Nava def.  Matteo Donati, 6–2, 6–1

Doubles

  Ilija Bozoljac /  Filip Krajinović def.  Nikoloz Basilashvili /  Aliaksandr Bury, 6–1, 6–2

External links
Official Website

Tennis Napoli Cup
Tennis Napoli Cup
2015 in Italian tennis